Megachile discorhina is a species of bee in the family Megachilidae. It was described by Theodore Dru Alison Cockerell 1924.

References

Discorhina
Insects described in 1924